The Ijtihad class consists of four fast patrol boats build by Lürssen Werft, Germany and delivered to Brunei in 2009. They patrol the coast of Brunei and sometimes participate in joint naval exercises.

Development

Background 
A total of four Ijtihad-class fast patrol boats have been commissioned into service with the Royal Brunei Navy (RBN), where two of the ships began operating since March 2010 followed by another two on 28 August 2010.

Two Ijtihad-class fast patrol boats arrived in Brunei Darussalam on 27 August 2010. The boats, named Kapal Diraja Brunei (KDB) Syafaat and KDB Afiat were commissioned at the RBN Base in Muara, Brunei. They are part of the project between the government of His Majesty The Sultan and Yang Di-Pertuan of Negara Brunei Darussalam and Lürssen Werft.

The commissioning ceremony of both vessels was officiated by Major General Dato Paduka Seri Haji Aminuddin Ihsan bin Pehin Orang Kaya Saiful Mulok Dato Seri Paduka Haji Abidin, Commander of the Royal Brunei Armed Forces (RBAF). Like previous fast patrol boats, KDB Syafaat and KDB Afiat were produced in Germany and completed sea trials. KDB Ijtihad and KDB Berkat began operations on 15 March 2010.

Ships of class

References 

Fast attack craft
Royal Brunei Navy